A Thousand Tomorrows is the first book in the Cody Gunner series by Karen Kingsbury.

It was adapted into a television series for PureFlix.

Summary 
Cody Gunner is a nationally renowned bull rider-cocky, brash, a legend among his peers. On track to the top, Cody has rejected everything about his past-his famous father, his hurting mother, and every woman who ever came along. His heart has room only for his young disabled brother. Ali Daniels is the most recognized horsewoman in her sport. She embraces life, making the most of every moment and risking everything for her passion. Along the way, Ali seeks to fulfill the dreams of her little sister, a girl who died before she had a chance to live. And so competing is all she needs until the day Cody discovers what Ali has been hiding so well. Reluctantly Ali allows Cody into her private world. Despite their fears, they bare their souls and love finds them in a way that it seldom finds anyone. In a breathless race for time, their love becomes the one part of them that will never fail, never die. In the end they find something brilliant and brief - a thousand tomorrows.

Reception 
Publishers Weekly wrote that "Despite the plot's limitations, Kingsbury fans will undoubtedly be pleased by more of the inspirational fiction for which this author has become beloved." A review in The Daily Oklahoman wrote that the story had an "unusual plot" and that Kinsgbury "paints a sweet picture of unending love."

References 

American Christian novels
2005 novels